Lizard Head Glacier is located in Shoshone National Forest, in the U.S. state of Wyoming,  WNW of Lizard Head Peak.

See also
 List of glaciers in the United States

References

Glaciers of Fremont County, Wyoming
Glaciers of Wyoming